Adoxa is the type genus of flowering plants in the family Adoxaceae. It contains at least 2 species of flowering plant, including the moschatel, for which the family is named.
Adoxa moschatellina L.
Adoxa xizangensis G.Yao

References

Adoxaceae
Dipsacales genera